Cardoso Moreira Futebol Clube, usually known simply as Cardoso Moreira, is a currently inactive Brazilian football club from Cardoso Moreira, Rio de Janeiro state. 

The club plays its home matches at Antônio Ferreira de Medeiros. Cardoso Moreira competed in the Campeonato Carioca in 2008 and won the Campeonato Carioca Fourth Level in 1994 and the Campeonato Carioca Third Level in 2006.

History
The club was founded on March 19, 1935.

In 1994, Cardoso Moreira won the Campeonato Carioca Fourth Level, and in 2006 the club won the Campeonato Carioca Third Level, after beating Silva Jardim in the final. In 2007, the club was promoted to the following year's Campeonato Carioca. and on January 19, 2008, the club played its first Campeonato Carioca match, against Fluminense. Fluminense beat Cardoso Moreira 2-0.

Achievements
Campeonato Carioca Third Division: 2006
Campeonato Carioca Fourth Division: 1994

Stadium
Cardoso Moreira's home stadium is Antônio Ferreira de Medeiros, with a maximum capacity of 10,000 people.

References

External links
 Cardoso Moreira Futebol Clube's official website

Inactive football clubs in Brazil
Association football clubs established in 1935
Football clubs in Rio de Janeiro (state)
1935 establishments in Brazil